Shi, or Nyabungu, is a Bantu language of the Democratic Republic of the Congo.

The Nyindu variety is heavily influenced by Lega, and speakers consider it a dialect of Lega rather than Shi, as Shi speakers see it. Maho (2009) leaves it unclassified as JD.501.

The people who speak Mashi are known as Bashi. They are the largest tribe in South Kivu, whose capital city is Bukavu. 

The Bashi occupy a vast region known as Bushi. Like Ngweshe, Kabare, Katana, Luhuinja, Burhinyi, Kaziba, Nyengezi, and Idjui where live the Bahavu who are also part of this group; Idjui is a large island in Kivu lake between DRC and Rwanda.

References

Languages of the Democratic Republic of the Congo
Great Lakes Bantu languages